= Eugeia =

Eugeia (Ancient Greek: Εὔγεια) was a town of ancient Arcadia mentioned by Stephanus of Byzantium.

Its site is unlocated.
